Bencho Yordanov Obreshkov (27 April 1899, Karnobat - 8 April 1970, Sofia) was a renowned Bulgarian painter. 

He graduated under Petko Klissurov and Ivan Angelov from the Sofia Academy of Fine Arts in 1920, and specialized in painting under Oskar Kokoschka and Otto Dix in the Dresden Academy of Fine Arts in 1926 and sculpture under Antoine Bourdelle, Paris in 1925—-1927. Obreshkov returned to Bulgaria in 1927. He was a member of the "Native Arts" Union (1927), a member of the Union of the New Artists (1931), and its chairman (1937).

The painting by Obreshkov is innovative for Bulgarian art of the 1930s and has a special attention to color and form.

References

1899 births
1970 deaths
20th-century Bulgarian painters
20th-century male artists
Modern painters 
Bulgarian watercolor painters
People from Karnobat
Male painters